Maskikopawiscikosik 229 is an Indian reserve of the Peter Ballantyne Cree Nation in Saskatchewan.

References

Indian reserves in Saskatchewan
Peter Ballantyne Cree Nation